Woodfield Mall is a shopping mall located in the northwest Chicago suburb of Schaumburg, Illinois, United States, at the intersection of Golf Road and Interstate 290. The mall is the largest shopping mall in the state of Illinois, the second largest being Oakbrook Center in Oak Brook. It is also one of the largest shopping malls in the United States.

The mall is located approximately 27 miles from the Chicago Loop and attracts more than 27 million visitors each year. The mall features 234 stores and is anchored by JCPenney, Macy's (formerly Marshall Field's) and Nordstrom. It also has 7 other restaurants which are Red Robin, Uncle Julio's, P.F. Chang's China Bistro, Panda Express, The Cheesecake Factory, Kinfork BBQ, and Texas de Brazil.

The mall was originally developed by Taubman Centers, which later sold the mall to CalPERS, Miller Capital Advisory, and GM Pension Trusts. Taubman continued to manage the mall until December 31, 2012, when GM Pension Trusts sold its stake in the mall to Simon Property Group, which took over management effective January 1, 2013.

History

1960s–1970s 
Construction began on Woodfield Mall in July 1969 and the mall opened on September 9, 1971, with 59 stores, growing to 189 stores with 1.9 million retail square feet by 1973, along with a large 135-foot-tall water tower to supply water to the mall and the nearby village. It was the largest mall in the United States at the time of its opening.

Woodfield Mall is named after former Sears board chairman General Robert E. Wood and Marshall Field and Company founder Marshall Field. Singer Carol Lawrence, actor Vincent Price, and two marching bands entertained at the debut. At the time of its opening, it claimed to be the world's largest shopping center. By the end of September 1971, another 28 stores and restaurants had opened and that first business year finished with 138 specialty retailers. In 1973, a new Lord & Taylor wing was constructed, along with 50 additional new retailers.

1980s–1990s 
Sbarro opened in 1984 and A&W opened in 1985. The 5-plex opened for business on July 30, 1971. The mall also had a pair of free-standing twin cinemas, Woodfield Theatres 1 & 2 and Woodfield Theatres 3 & 4, at the perimeter of the mall near Golf Road. The 1 & 2 was opened with 2 G-rated films, including a Disney movie, and the 3 & 4 later opened; both were closed and demolished in the 1990s, replaced by additional retail. The Woodfield Mall Cinemas 5-plex closed in 2000 and was last operated by Cineplex Odeon Corporation. After it closed, the space was turned into a theme restaurant called Mars 2112, which was very short-lived. The former theater area was converted into an Improv Comedy Club in 2006, the first location in Illinois. The Loews Theatres at the Streets of Woodfield, an outdoor shopping center next to Woodfield Mall, made its debut as a 20-screener on December 10, 1999. The Streets of Woodfield was built between 1999 and 2000, replacing another indoor mall, One Schaumburg Place, which opened in 1991. The Streets of Woodfield featured Carson's, Dick's Sporting Goods (formerly Galyan's), and GameWorks. The freestanding Loews Theatres complex was eventually rebranded by the AMC Theatres chain in 2016. Carson's at The Streets of Woodfield closed in 2018. A&W closed in 2019.

An outdoor shopping center named Woodfield Village Green opened across the street in late 1993. In October 1994, a three-story parking garage attached to Marshall Field's opened. That year, TGI Fridays opened northwest of the mall. Hooters would open in the surrounding area a year layer in 1995. In celebration of its 20th anniversary in 1991, Woodfield added 23 more stores, including The Disney Store, and then in 1995, Woodfield grew again with a $110 million wing that included 50 new specialty stores. Rainforest Cafe was added to the mall in October of that same year. In 1996, the mall received a three-level Nordstrom and a larger replacement Lord & Taylor. Of these new-for-1995 stores, nearly 40 were flagship concepts and designs, with about 27 of them the largest in their chains. In June 1997, a Stir Crazy restaurant opened between Sears and Marshall Field's. Joe's Crab Shack opened on the northeast edge of the mall the same year, but it was one of 41 locations in the chain to close in 2017. IKEA opened a three-story location across from Woodfield Mall on November 18, 1998.

While all of this expansion continued at Woodfield Mall, the surrounding village of Schaumburg grew as well. In 1970, the population was 19,000; in 1980, it mushroomed to 55,000; and, according to the U.S. Census Bureau, Schaumburg had over 75,000 people in 2000. Schaumburg Mayor Al Larson observed that, "Woodfield established a focal point for development throughout all of the northwest suburbs. Without Woodfield, we wouldn't have office towers in Itasca or corporate development in Hoffman Estates."

In 1995, Woodfield Associates commissioned a brand new $128,000 paint job for the mall water tower. Woodfield paid an additional $97,000 for the exterior painting. Both the interiors and exteriors of the water tower were completely repainted. The tower was completely drained of water before the new paint job could be applied. Afterwards, the interior and exterior of the tower were thoroughly cleaned, and rust spots were treated properly. The painting of the interior began after the cleaning and treatment, followed by the painting of the exterior. For the exterior, Woodfield chose a base layer of light gray, along with four continuous, teal "W"s (for Woodfield) around the bowl of the tower. The entire painting process took around 350 gallons of paint.

2000s–2010s 
DSW and Linens 'n Things opened outside the mall east of Sears and Marshall Field's in 1999; Linens 'n Things would officially close in 2008 and Ashley Furniture opened in its spot on March 26, 2010. Multiple restaurants would open in 2001; Red Robin, in the Lord & Taylor wing and The Cheesecake Factory, in the JCPenney wing, along with an Olive Garden outside the mall. An Apple Store opened in the Lord & Taylor wing on August 24, 2001. The following year, Torrid opened on the second floor in the JCPenney wing on September 18, 2002, six days after a store of the same name at Orland Square Mall in Orland Park opened. A Lego Store was added to the mall in 2003 as one of seven "prototype" stores across the United States.

Fountains, the waterfall and the aquariums were removed from the mall in 2004. The water tower was repainted in 2005, ten years after its original repaint. The current scheme includes small, black text reading "Woodfield Mall" with large white clouds in the background, along with a representation of Schaumburg's skyscrapers in blue right below the text. Blue sky can be seen above the clouds, covering the very top of the bowl. P.F. Chang's China Bistro and Texas de Brazil opened at the mall in 2005, bringing the restaurant count within the mall to 38. Following the acquisition of Marshall Field's, by Macy's, the store was renamed in September 2006.

2010s–2020s 
A McDonald's was renovated on June 29, 2012. Also, that same year, Pink by Victoria's Secret opened to the public. LongHorn Steakhouse opened on the northeast corner outside of the mall on October 1, 2012. Three stores opened at the mall in 2013, Forever 21 and a two-story H&M opened in the Sears wing, along with a Microsoft Store which opened in the Lord & Taylor wing.

Lululemon and Arhaus opened in the Lord & Taylor and Nordstrom wings in June 2014. In November of that same year, Columbia Sportswear opened near Lord & Taylor; the store closed in 2019. A portion of the second level of Sears was subleased to Level 257 (now Enterrium), a Pac Man-themed restaurant featuring a bowling alley, an arcade and pinball machines in 2015. Along with a major renovation, Zara, Timberland, Kids Foot Locker and rue21 opened. Kinfork BBQ opened in December between Nordstrom and JCPenney; it closed in 2019.

Uncle Julio's officially opened in the JCPenney wing in 2016, replacing Ruby Tuesday, which closed in 2012.  Victoria's Secret was substantially remodeled in 2017. A large food court, known as the "Dining Pavilion", opened on the second floor in 2017, in the east court opposite of the main mall entrance. It features Chipotle Mexican Grill, Blaze Pizza, and more. It replaced two level 2 stores: F.Y.E., which moved to a smaller location on the lower level near Dunkin' Donuts, and A'GACI ladies' wear. A year before the opening of the Dining Pavilion, a fourth elevator was added. A'GACI ladies' wear has since closed.

In the summer of 2018, Blocks to Bricks, which is a hybrid between a store and museum dedicated to Legos and other construction toys, opened to customers. On October 26, 2018, Uniqlo, which is a Japanese clothing chain, opened in the JCPenney wing. Also, a salon was added in the Sears wing near Jimmy John's. Shake Shack opened outside the mall on October 8, 2019. Molly's Cupcakes opened in the Nordstrom wing in December 2019.

2020s–present 

It was replaced by the Peppa Pig World of Play amusement center, which opened in early 2021. Woodfield Mall closed temporarily in March 2020 due to the COVID-19 pandemic. It eventually reopened on May 29, 2020, with limited hours and safety instructions. These instructions included social distancing, face covering and hand sanitizing. Lord & Taylor announced it would close all of its locations on August 20, 2020, including its location in Woodfield Mall. The Disney Store location in Woodfield closed on September 1, 2021, following an announcement on August 24, 2021, that all Chicago area Disney Stores would close. Transformco, the parent company for Sears, announced that the Woodfield Mall location would close that November; Sears closed on November 14, 2021. The location was the last remaining Sears store in Illinois following 50 years of operation.

Renovations 

An "underground" food court in the main courtyard of the mall was closed in the late 1990s. At first it closed off the opening to the lower eating area and stairway. The mall closed off the opening to the food court below. This new flooring tile outlined the former opening to the food court below. This floor outline was eliminated in renovating the courtyard.

Woodfield planned and announced a $13.8 million renovation in January 2015. The makeover consisted of an updated grand court, including the removal of the brick fixtures and leveling out many multi-leveled sections of floor. The renovation also includes new flooring for both lower and upper levels, replacing two existing elevators, and adding one new elevator. The renovation was predicted to be finished by the end of the year.

In 2017, Woodfield planned and announced a $14 million renovation to introduce a new food court in the Sears wing. The food court introduced a seating area containing 820 seats for quality fast-casual dining restaurants such as Chipotle Mexican Grill, Charley's Philly Steaks, Blaze Fast Fire'd Pizza, and more.

Car incident 

On September 20, 2019, at around 2:30 PM CDT, a man drove a black first generation (2001-2008) Chevrolet TrailBlazer LT through an entrance door of Sears and began driving through the store and into the main concourse of the mall, crashing into kiosks, Clarks, International Diamond Company, and multiple other stores, seemingly targeting Forever 21 and other adjacent stores. The driver was taken into custody by responding police near the center of the mall's first level without further incident. The identity of the suspect was not immediately released. No injuries were reported, but the mall was temporarily on lockdown due to the incident as well as concurrent, but unfounded, reports of an active shooter. The mall was evacuated about one hour after the incident.

The man, later identified as Javier Garcia of Palatine, Illinois, was charged with terrorism as a result of the incident; he appeared in court on September 29, 2019, and was denied bond. He appeared in court again on October 1, 2019, and was due back in court on January 27, 2020. Garcia's family spoke out arguing that Javier is not a terrorist and that he has schizophrenia, though a police investigation shows evidence that Garcia's attack was premeditated, with investigators releasing – in part – that Garcia "searched 'Woodfield mall,' the aerial view of the mall and mall premises 124 times between 9/19/19 at 14:38 and 9/20/19 at 12:55." Garcia has since also been charged with an unrelated arson case from September 8, 2019, in his hometown of Palatine.

Bus routes 
Pace

  208 Golf Road  
  554 Elgin/Woodfield  
 604 Wheeling/Schaumburg  
 606 Rosemont/Schaumburg Limited

See also 
 Golden Corridor, the region of commerce around the Jane Addams Memorial Tollway
 The Streets of Woodfield

References

External links 

 Official Site
 Schaumburg Convention Center

Shopping malls in Illinois
Simon Property Group
Shopping malls in Cook County, Illinois
Buildings and structures in Cook County, Illinois
Shopping malls established in 1971
1971 establishments in Illinois
Schaumburg, Illinois
Tourist attractions in Cook County, Illinois